"Girlfriend" is a song by Swedish synthpop duo Icona Pop. It was released worldwide on 4 June 2013 as a digital download, except for Sweden where it was released on 7 June. The song was written by Icona Pop and Marcus "Mack" Sepehrmanesh and produced by Stargate, co-produced by Caweh Passereh, Mark Knight and James Reynolds. The song interpolates the lyrics from Tupac Shakur's "Me and My Girlfriend".

Track listing

Digital download
"Girlfriend" – 2:50

Germany single
"Girlfriend" – 2:50
"Girlfriend" (The Chainsmokers Remix) – 4:37
"I Love It" (Tiësto Remix) (feat. Charli XCX) – 5:10
"Ready for the Weekend" – 2:42

Credits and personnel
 Lead vocals – Icona Pop
 Lyrics – Marcus Sephermanesh, Aino Jawo, Caroline Hjelt, Mikkel Storleer Eriksen, Tor Erik Hermansen, Marvin Harper, Ricky Rouse, Tupac Shakur, Tyrone Wrice
 Producer, programmer, all instruments – StarGate
 Co-producer – Mark Knight, James F. Reynolds, Caweh Passereh
 Executive producer – Tim Blacksmith, Danny D
 Recorded by – Mikkel S. Eriksen, Miles Walker
 Additional production, additional recording – Elof Loelv
 Additional engineer, assistant engineer – Daniela Rivera
 Mixer – Phil Tan
 Masterer – Colin Leonard
 Label: Big Beat

Charts

Certifications

Release history

References

2013 singles
2013 songs
Icona Pop songs
Songs written by Aino Jawo
Songs written by Caroline Hjelt
Songs written by Marcus Sepehrmanesh
Songs written by Mikkel Storleer Eriksen
Songs written by Tor Erik Hermansen
Songs written by Tupac Shakur
Song recordings produced by Stargate (record producers)
Big Beat Records (American record label) singles